Richmond Nketiah (born 28 October 1994) is a Ghanaian footballer who plays as a right back or defensive midfielder.

Club career
He signed a contract with the Russian team FC Arsenal Tula before the 2015–16 season, but was unable to play for the team due to health issues.

In March 2017, he joined Latvian club SK Babīte.

International career
In 2013, coach Sellas Tetteh called him up to be a member of the Ghana U20 for the African Youth Championship in Algeria and for the FIFA U-20 World Cup in Turkey.

References

External links
 

1994 births
Living people
Ghanaian footballers
Ghana under-20 international footballers
Association football defenders
Medeama SC players
FC Jūrmala players
FC Arsenal Tula players
Ghanaian expatriate footballers
Expatriate footballers in Latvia
Expatriate footballers in Russia
Ghanaian expatriate sportspeople in Russia